is a railway station in Mashiko, Tochigi Prefecture, Japan, operated by the Mooka Railway.

Lines
Mashiko Station is a station on the Mooka Line, and is located 25.1 rail kilometers from the terminus of the line at Shimodate Station.

Station layout
Mashiko Station has a single side platform serving traffic in both directions.

History
Mashiko Station opened on 11 July 1913 as a station on the Japanese Government Railway, which subsequently became the Japanese National Railways (JNR). The station was absorbed into the JR East network upon the privatization of the JNR on 1 April 1987, and the Mooka Railway from 11 April 1988. A new station building was completed in March 1988.

Surrounding area
Mashiko Town Hall
Mashiko Post Office
Japan National Route 121
Japan National Route 294

References

External links

 Mooka Railway Station information 

Railway stations in Tochigi Prefecture
Railway stations in Japan opened in 1913
Mashiko, Tochigi